Argemone polyanthemos, the crested pricklypoppy, also known as bluestem prickly poppy, pricklypoppy, white prickly poppy, annual pricklypoppy, or as thistle poppy is an annual plant with yellow sap and showy white flowers in the poppy family (Papaveraceae).

Distribution
It can be found in areas with dry soil from Texas northward to North Dakota and as far west as Washington State. It has spread or been introduced to areas adjacent to its natural range, which was primarily east of the Rocky Mountains in the shortgrass and mixed grass prairies.

Morphology
One of the distinguishing characteristics is the absence of prickles on upper leaf surfaces, though as with all species in the genus it has many prickles on stems and leaf margins. Plants are variable in height, but often grow to one meter, with exceptional individuals reaching 1.2 meters with deeply lobed 20 cm leaves. The leaves and stems are pale blue green. The 7-10 cm flowers bloom from late spring into summer. Each flower has 4-6 very thin translucent white petals that flutter in the wind and a dense center cluster of yellow stamens. In late summer the plant has sparsely prickly seed capsules with small black seeds. Broken or nicked stems produce thick orange-yellow sap. It has a large taproot for accessing water in freely draining soils. All parts of the plant are poisonous. Because of its prickly defenses, and acrid taste from its poisons, grazing animals tend to avoid it, so it increases in numbers compared to other plants in grazed areas.

Usage
Argemone polyanthemos is sometimes planted in gardens as a ornamental plant for its long succession of showy blooms. It grows well in sandy or gravelly soil of somewhat poor quality with little to no supplemental watering. It dislikes being transplanted and seed is placed outside by growers on the soil surface before the last frost date.

References

polyanthemos
Flora of the Sonoran Deserts
Flora of Colorado
Flora of Illinois
Flora of Indiana
Flora of Iowa
Flora of Kansas
Flora of Montana
Flora of New Mexico
Flora of North Dakota
Flora of Oklahoma
Flora of South Dakota
Flora of Texas
Flora of Utah
Flora of Washington (state)
Flora of Wyoming